Czech Century (is a Czech historical television series. It deals with the background of important historical events in Czech history since World War I to Dissolution of Czechoslovakia. According to the creators, it is not a pure documentary series, but rather a film series "exposing the taboo of key events of our modern history". In particular, the series studies the psychology and mental motivations of individual actors of historical events in the moments when these personalities "had a knife to their throats" and were aware that their decision would affect not only their loved ones, but the entire nation for many years to come. The authors deliberately do not evaluate whether the persons in question behaved right or wrong from a historical point of view.

"Legendary characters are just people who sweat, speculate, live paradoxes, go to the toilet and talk about banalities, themselves confused about where history has taken them, and follow the only possible principle, which is the 'moral law within me', however they end up acting badly and selfishly." — series creators.

Cast
Martin Huba as Tomáš Masaryk
Daniela Kolářová as Charlotte Garrigue
Jiří Bábek as Jan Masaryk
Ivana Uhlířová as Olga Masaryková
Martin Finger and Jan Novotný as Edvard Beneš
Monika Fingerová as Hana Benešová
Jaromír Janeček as Jan Herben
Jan Grygar as Přemysl Šámal
Mário Kubec as Karel Kramář
Igor Bareš as František Thun
Pavel Rímský as Robert Cecil
Miroslav Donutil as David Lloyd George
Ivo Novák as Henry Wickham Steed
Jaromír Nosek as Robert William Seton-Watson
Radim Novák as Jaromír Smutný
Daniel Landa as Emanuel Moravec
Karel Dobrý as Lev Prchala
Luboš Veselý as Vojtěch Luža
Miloslav Mejzlík as Ludvík Krejčí
Pavel Batěk as Karel Paleček
David Suchařípa as Silvestr Bláha
Miro Grisa as Karel Husárek
Martin Stránský as Sergej Vojcechovský
Robert Jašków as Jan Syrový
Ivan Trojan as František Moravec
Aleš Procházka as Sergěj Ingr
Michal Dlouhý as Emil Strankmüller
Andreas Kaulfuss as Eugen de Witte
Hartmut Krug as Wenzel Jaksch
Richard Syms as Winston Churchill
Marian Roden as Hubert Ripka
Jiří Vyorálek as Klement Gottwald
Rita Jasinská as Marta Gottwaldová
Radek Holub as Alexej Čepička
Jaromír Dulava as Antonín Zápotocký
David Novotný as Rudolf Slánský
Jan Budař as Václav Kopecký
Jiří Štrébl as Václav Nosek
Jiří Havel as Jan Šrámek
Jiří Čapka as Adolf Procházka
Miroslav Babuský as Jan Jína
Vilém Udatný as Ivo Ducháček
Martin Veliký as Július Ďuriš
Václav Knop as Jaroslav Stránský
Matěj Dadák as Prokop Drtina
Hanuš Bor as Petr Zenkl
Peter Varga as Julius Firt
Karel Zima as Bohumil Laušman
Matúš Bukovčan as Štefan Kočvara
Tomáš Kraucher as Vladimír Krajina
Jan Holík as František Hála
Petra Jungmanová as Milada Horáková
Vladimír Koval as Valerian Alexandrovič Zorin
Zdeněk Bureš as Antonín Novotný
Andrej Bestchastny as Anastas Mikojan
Emil Horváth as Ludvík Svoboda
Ján Gallovič and Alois Švehlík as Alexander Dubček
Peter Marcin as Vasil Biľak
Oleksandr Ignatuša as Leonid Brezhnev
Alexander Podolkhov as Alexei Kosygin
Ján Greššo as Gustáv Husák
Jiří Zapletal ml. as Josef Smrkovský
Jan Vondráček as Oldřich Černík
Zdeněk Černín as František Kriegel
Petr Halberstadt as Zdeněk Mlynář
Marek Daniel as Václav Havel
Tereza Hofová as Olga Havlová
David Matásek as Pavel Kohout
Jan Hájek as Ivan Martin Jirous
František Němec as Jan Patočka
Petr Vacek as František Šmejkal
Martin Myšička as Jiří Němec
Miroslav Táborský as Jiří Hájek
Michal Pavlata as Václav Černý
Petr Batěk as Petr Uhl
Jiří Lábus as Ladislav Adamec
Roman Luknár as Marián Čalfa
Oldřich Kaiser as Oskar Krejčí
Václav Jiráček as Václav Malý
Jan Krafta as Vladimír Hanzel
Jan Sklenář as Alexandr Vondra
Miroslav Hanuš as Petr Pithart
Daniel Rous as Jiří Křižan
Matej Landl as Ján Čarnogurský
Martin Janouš as Jan Stráský
Martin Dejdar as Miroslav Macek
Jaroslav Plesl as Václav Klaus
Marek Ťapák as Vladimír Mečiar
Bohumil Klepl as Tomáš Ježek
Petr Pelzer as Pavel Tigrid

Episodes

References

External links
Official website

2013 Czech television series debuts
Czech Television original programming
Czech drama television series
Czech historical television series